The Temburong River is a river in Brunei. It is the second smallest of the four main rivers in the country and drains a catchment area of around 840 square kilometres. Temburong District, through which it flows, is one of the four districts of Brunei. It lies in the east and is sparsely populated.

Sites 
Bangar Town is one of the largest human settlements in the district in which the river passes through. Additionally the Sultan Haji Omar Ali Saifuddien Bridge is not far from the mouth of the river, in Brunei Bay. Going upstream would reach several tourist hotspots such as Belalong Canopy Walkway, Bukit Patoi Recreational Park, Freme Lodge & Adventure Park, and many more.

Some of Brunei's historical sites are located along the river banks, including:

 Ulu Temburong National Park, the first national park of Brunei which was protected in 1991.
 Utama Mohammad Salleh Mosque, a 1968 mosque in Bangar Town.
 Labu Estate Rubber Industrial Site, is a plantation and agriculture site from the 1900s.

References 

Rivers of Brunei